The 1967 Cornell Big Red football team was an American football team that represented Cornell University during the 1967 NCAA University Division football season. Cornell finished third in the Ivy League . 

In its second season under head coach Jack Musick, the team compiled a 6–2–1 record and outscored opponents 210 to 145. Ron Kopicki was the team captain. 

Cornell's 4–2–1 conference record placed third in the Ivy League standings. The Big Red outscored Ivy opponents 164 to 131. 

Cornell played its home games at Schoellkopf Field in Ithaca, New York.

Schedule

References

Cornell
Cornell Big Red football seasons
Cornell Big Red football